The Chullora Bus Workshops were the central workshops for the State Transit Authority and its predecessors, located on the north western corner of Roberts and Norfolk Roads Chullora.

History
Chullora Bus Workshops opened on 30 June 1958 as the central workshops for the Department for Government Transport's bus fleet. Spread over 32 acres, it took over the function of performing all heavy maintenance and overhauls that had previously been performed at the much more confined Leichhardt Bus Depot.

Although primarily a maintenance facility, it did body an AEC Reliance and Leyland Leopard chassis in 1964. With newer vehicles requiring far less maintenance, overhauls at the workshops ceased in October 1989 with final closure in 1990. A smaller facility was established at Randwick for mechanical repairs with body repairs contracted to the private sector. The site was turned into a residential development.

References

Bus garages
Industrial buildings in Sydney
1958 establishments in Australia
1990 disestablishments in Australia
City of Canterbury-Bankstown